Hemoglobin subunit alpha, Hemoglobin, alpha 1, is a hemoglobin protein that in humans is encoded by the HBA1 gene.

Gene 

The human alpha globin gene cluster located on chromosome 16 spans about 30 kb and includes seven loci: 5'- zeta - pseudozeta - mu - pseudoalpha-1 - alpha-2 - alpha-1 - theta - 3'. The alpha-2 (HBA2) and alpha-1 (HBA1; this gene) coding sequences are identical. These genes differ slightly over the 5' untranslated regions and the introns, but they differ significantly over the 3' untranslated regions.

Protein 

Two alpha chains plus two beta chains constitute HbA, which in normal adult life comprises about 97% of the total hemoglobin; alpha chains combine with delta chains to constitute HbA-2, which with fetal hemoglobin (HbF) makes up the remaining 3% of adult hemoglobin.

Clinical significance 

Alpha thalassemias result from deletions of each of the alpha genes as well as deletions of both HBA2 and HBA1; some nondeletion alpha thalassemias have also been reported.

Interactions 

Hemoglobin subunit alpha has been shown to interact with hemoglobin subunit beta (HBB).

See also
Hemoglobin subunit beta
Human β-globin locus

References

Further reading

External links
  GeneReviews/NCBI/NIH/UW entry on Alpha-Thalassemia
  OMIM entries on Alpha-Thalassemia
 

Hemoglobins